Kahemba is a territory of the Democratic Republic of the Congo.  It is located in Kwango Province.
Divisions are:
Kulindji Sector
Bindu Sector
Bangu Sector
Muloshi Chiefdom
Mwa-Mushiko Chiefdom
Mwendjila Chiefdom

References

Statoids.com  Retrieved December 8, 2010.

Territories of Kwango Province
Democratic Republic of Congo geography articles needing translation from French Wikipedia